"Shock" is a song by American heavy metal band Fear Factory. It was the lead single from their 1998 album Obsolete and the first track on the album. Its music was composed by guitarist Dino Cazares and drummer Raymond Herrera. The lyrics were written by vocalist Burton C. Bell. The introduction of a concept album, "Shock" introduces its protagonist, a political prisoner known only as Edgecrusher, who declares his personal mission to destroy the totalitarian society in which he lives.

The song was featured in the TV series Angel from season 2 episode 10 "Reunion".

Track listing

Personnel
Fear Factory
Burton C. Bell – vocals
Dino Cazares – guitar, mixing
Christian Olde Wolbers – bass
Raymond Herrera – drums

Additional
Rhys Fulber – keyboards and programming, production, mixing

1998 singles
Fear Factory songs
Songs written by Burton C. Bell
Roadrunner Records singles
Songs written by Dino Cazares